Caren Lyn Tackett (née Manuel; born August 14, 1976) is an American stage actress who has provided voice-overs for animation productions of 4Kids Entertainment, including Winx Club, Pokémon Chronicles, Shaman King and Teenage Mutant Ninja Turtles.  She has worked in various Broadway productions in New York City, including Hair, Rent, High Fidelity, Brooklyn and The Times They Are A'Changin' .

Filmography

Animation
 Shaman King  –  Kanna, Jeanne
 Winx Club (2004–07) – Stella, Darcy, Mirta, Chatta (4Kids dub, credited as Caren Lyn Manuel)
 Teenage Mutant Ninja Turtles - Valencia
 Pokémon Chronicles - Marina

Toys and videogames
 Winx Club - Stella, Darcy, Mirta (Konami, VG) (2005)
 Winx Club Singsational Dolls (Mattel) - Stella
 Shaman King: Power of Spirit (VG) - Kanna

Theatre roles
 Rent (1996–2008) – Maureen (Broadway, understudy and World Tour), Mimi (Broadway, understudy), Mrs. Cohen
 Brooklyn (2004–05) – Brooklyn (understudy), Faith (understudy)
 The Times They Are A-Changin' (2006) – Cleo
 High Fidelity (2006) – Sarah, Liz (understudy), Charlie (understudy), Marie LaSalle (understudy), Jackie (understudy)
 Hair (2011) – Sheila
 Born Blue (2012) – Co-producer, writer
 Evita - Eva
 Grease - Sandy
 Fame - Carmen
 Les Misérables - Eponine

References

External links
 
 
 

1976 births
Living people
American voice actresses
21st-century American actresses
20th-century American actresses
Actresses from Massachusetts
Actresses from Colorado
People from Bedford, Massachusetts
People from Manitou Springs, Colorado
American stage actresses
American women writers